The Bankhead–Jones Act was enacted  on June 29, 1935 during the Depression, to provide increased federal funding to land grant colleges.  Under the law as was last increased in 1972, $8,100,000 per year is divided equally between all states, and another $4,360,000 is divided between the states based upon each state's population. These federal funds are subject to matching by the states.

References

External links
 Text of statute
 

1935 in law
Acts of the 74th United States Congress

History of universities and colleges in the United States
United States federal agriculture legislation
United States federal public land legislation